Nizhneye Avryuzovo (Tübänge Äwrez) is a rural locality (a selo) and the administrative center of Nizhneavryuzovsky Selsoviet, Alsheyevsky District, Bashkortostan, Russia. The population was 683 as of 2010. There are 9 streets.

Geography 
Nizhneye Avryuzovo is located 24 km south of Rayevsky (the district's administrative centre) by road. Mechnikovo is the nearest rural locality.

References 

Rural localities in Alsheyevsky District